Mount Frank Rae is the highest mountain of the Ogilvie Mountains in central Yukon, Canada, located  northeast of Dawson City.

References

Two-thousanders of Yukon